Mariana Gradim Alves Amorim (born 15 October 1995) is a Portuguese female acrobatic gymnast. With partner Alfredo Pereira, Gradim Alves Amorim competed in the 2014 Acrobatic Gymnastics World Championships.

References

1995 births
Living people
Portuguese acrobatic gymnasts
Female acrobatic gymnasts